National Institute of Fashion Technology Hyderabad known as NIFT Hyderabad is one of the 16 campuses of NIFT, an institution for Fashion, Design, Technology and Management located in Hyderabad, India. The institute is located at Madhapur, the heart of IT hub of Hyderabad. It is near the HITEC City metro station.

See also 
Education in India
Literacy in India
List of institutions of higher education in Telangana

References

External links
Official Website NIFT

Fashion schools in India
Universities and colleges in Hyderabad, India
2008 establishments in Andhra Pradesh
Educational institutions established in 2001
National Institute of Fashion Technology